Connor Howe (born June 10, 2000) is a Canadian professional speed skater.

He won the silver medal in the team pursuit event at the 2021 World Single Distances Speed Skating Championships.

Career

2022 Winter Olympics
In January 2022, Howe was named to his first Olympic team. Howe would skate to a fifth place finish in the 1500 metres event.

References

External links

2000 births
Living people
Canadian male speed skaters
People from Canmore, Alberta
World Single Distances Speed Skating Championships medalists
Speed skaters at the 2022 Winter Olympics
Olympic speed skaters of Canada
21st-century Canadian people